Darren Lewis Newman (born 14 August 1968) is an English former professional footballer who played as a defender in the Football League for Brighton & Hove Albion.

Club career
Newman started his career as an apprentice at Brighton & Hove Albion and after appearing as an unused substitute a number of times, he made his first team debut on 12 April 1986 in a 2–0 defeat to Shrewsbury Town.

References

1968 births
Living people
Footballers from Brighton
English footballers
Association football defenders
Brighton & Hove Albion F.C. players
Southwick F.C. players
Peacehaven & Telscombe F.C. players
Newhaven F.C. players
Ringmer F.C. players
Burgess Hill Town F.C. players
English Football League players